RLA may refer to any of the following:
 Railway Labor Act, US
 Ram Lal Anand College, New Delhi, India
 Risk-limiting audit of election outcomes
 Robert Land Academy, Canadian military academy
 Royal Lao Army